The 2001 Hidden Valley V8 Supercar round was the fourth round of the 2001 Shell Championship Series. It was held on the weekend of 12 to 13 May at Hidden Valley Raceway in Darwin, Northern Territory.

Race report 

The first race was won by Russell Ingall after a convincing drive saw him virtually unchallenged throughout most of the race. Mark Skaife initially got the jump, although was given a drive-through penalty shortly afterwards after officials deemed him to have jumped the start. A four-car collision at the start of the race involving Ambrose, Seton, Bowe and Tander. The collision saw Seton sustain significant damage and Tander retiring from the race. Craig Lowndes was also given a drive-through penalty after spinning Larry Perkins at turn four in the later stages of the race. Marcos Ambrose and Mark Larkham rounded out the podium.

The second race was of almost double the length of race two and was won by Greg Murphy. Ingall led most of the race, but encountered a tail-shaft problem with two laps to go, dropping him down the pack. The Holden Racing Team duo of Jason Bright and Mark Skaife rounded out the podium.

Race results

Qualifying

Top Ten Shootout

Race 1

Race 2

Race 3

Championship Standings

References

Hidden Valley
Sport in Darwin, Northern Territory
2000s in the Northern Territory
Motorsport in the Northern Territory